Ambassador Francisco del Río y Cañedo was born in Veracruz, Mexico on October 4, 1899 the son of Dr. Narciso del Río y Bausa and Modesta Tuñon y Cañedo both born in Remedios, Cuba.  He studied medicine and was president of the Federation of University Students.  In 1923 he joined the De la Huertista movement and was its representative in Havana, Cuba between 1924 and 1927.  He went on to specialize in surgery in Vienna, Berlin, London and Paris returning from Europe he practiced medicine in San Antonio, Texas until the 1940s when he returned to Mexico becoming a diplomat and serving as Mexican Ambassador to Uruguay, Guatemala, Canada, Chile, France, Yugoslavia, Dominican Republic, Belgium, Luxembourg, Czechoslovakia and Italy.  He died in Padua, Italy on August 18, 1963.

1899 births
1963 deaths
Ambassadors of Mexico to Uruguay
Ambassadors of Mexico to Canada
Ambassadors of Mexico to Chile
Ambassadors of Mexico to France
Ambassadors of Mexico to Yugoslavia
Ambassadors of Mexico to the Dominican Republic
Ambassadors of Mexico to Belgium
Ambassadors of Mexico to Luxembourg
Ambassadors of Mexico to Czechoslovakia
Ambassadors of Mexico to Italy
Ambassadors of Mexico to Guatemala